Arthur K. Beckley (September 1, 1901 – January 6, 1965) was an American football player.  He played college football for Michigan Agricultural College (later known as Michigan State University). He later played professional football in the National Football League for the Dayton Triangles during the 1926 season.

References

1901 births
1965 deaths
Michigan State Spartans football players
Dayton Triangles players
Players of American football from Iowa
People from Davis County, Iowa